A cortical column is a group of neurons forming a cylindrical structure through the cerebral cortex of the brain perpendicular to the cortical surface. The structure was first identified by Mountcastle in 1957. He later identified minicolumns as the basic units of the neocortex which were arranged into columns. Each contains the same types of neurons, connectivity, and firing properties. Columns are also called hypercolumn, macrocolumn, functional column or sometimes cortical module,. Neurons within a minicolumn (microcolumn) encode similar features, whereas a hypercolumn "denotes a unit containing a full set of values for any given set of receptive field parameters". A cortical module is defined as either synonymous with a hypercolumn (Mountcastle) or as a tissue block of multiple overlapping hypercolumns.

Cortical columns are proposed to be the canonical microcircuits for predictive coding, in which the process of cognition is implemented through a hierarchy of identical microcircuits. The evolutionary benefit to this duplication allowed human neocortex to increase in size by almost 3-fold over just the last 3 million years.

The columnar hypothesis states that the cortex is composed of discrete, modular columns of neurons, characterized by a consistent connectivity profile. The columnar organization hypothesis is currently the most widely adopted to explain the cortical processing of information.

Mammalian cerebral cortex

The mammalian cerebral cortex, the grey matter encapsulating the white matter, is composed of layers. The human cortex is between 2 and 3 mm thick. The number of layers is the same in most mammals, but varies throughout the cortex. In the neocortex 6 layers can be recognized although many regions lack one or more layers, fewer layers are present in the archipallium and the paleopallium.

Columnar functional organization
The columnar functional organization, as originally framed by Vernon Mountcastle, suggests that neurons that are horizontally more than 0.5 mm (500 µm) from each other do not have overlapping sensory receptive fields, and other experiments give similar results: 200–800 µm.  Various estimates suggest there are 50 to 100 cortical minicolumns in a hypercolumn, each comprising around 80 neurons. Their role is best understood as 'functional units of information processing.'

An important distinction is that the columnar organization is functional by definition, and reflects the local connectivity of the cerebral cortex.  Connections "up" and "down" within the thickness of the cortex are much denser than connections that spread from side to side.

Hubel and Wiesel studies
David Hubel and Torsten Wiesel followed up on Mountcastle's discoveries in the somatic sensory cortex with their own studies in vision. A part of the discoveries that resulted in them winning the 1981 Nobel Prize was that there were cortical columns in vision as well, and that the neighboring columns were also related in function in terms of the orientation of lines that evoked the maximal discharge. Hubel and Wiesel followed up on their own studies with work demonstrating the impact of environmental changes on cortical organization, and the sum total of these works resulted in their Nobel Prize.

Number of cortical columns
There are about 200 million (2×108) cortical minicolumns in the human neocortex with up to about 110 neurons each, and with estimates of 21–26 billion (2.1×1010–2.6×1010) neurons in the neocortex. With 50 to 100 cortical minicolumns per cortical column a human would have 2–4 million (2×106–4×106) cortical columns. There may be more if the columns can overlap, as suggested by Tsunoda et al. Jeff Hawkings claims that there are only 150,000 columns in the human neocortex, based on research made by his company Numenta. 

There are claims that minicolumns may have as many as 400 principal cells, but it is not clear if that includes glia cells.

Some contradicts the previous estimates, claiming the original research is too arbitrary. The authors propose a uniform neocortex, and chose a fixed width and length to calculate the cell numbers. Later research pointed out that the neocortex is indeed not uniform for other species, and studying nine primate species they found that “the number of neurons underneath 1 mm2 of the cerebral cortical surface … varies by three times across species." The neocortex is not uniform across species.  The actual number of neurons within a single column is variable, and depends on the cerebral areas and thus the function of the column.

See also
Cortical minicolumn
Ocular dominance column
Predictive coding
Radial unit hypothesis

References

External links

 The Blue Brain Project aims to simulate a cortical column
 On Intelligence—a popular science book about column function by Jeff Hawkins
  Summarizes what is known and corrects some misconceptions.

Neural circuits